Events from the year 1952 in Belgium

Incumbents
Monarch: Baudouin
Prime Minister: Joseph Pholien (to 15 January); Jean Van Houtte (from 15 January)

Events
 25 July – Treaty of Paris establishing the European Coal and Steel Community comes into force.
 12 October – Municipal elections

Births
 14 June – Filip Reyntjens, academic
 19 September – Bernard de Dryver, racing driver

Deaths
 21 July — Antonina Grégoire (born 1914), communist partisan
 1 October – John Langenus (born 1891), football referee.

References

 
Belgium
Years of the 20th century in Belgium
1950s in Belgium
Belgium